Peace Village may refer to:

 Peace Village (North Korea), a village in Panmun-gun, North Korea
 Peace Village, Vaughan, an Islamic housing project in Maple, Toronto, Canada
 Peace Village (Winnipeg, Manitoba), a temporary encampment by activists in front of the Provincial Legislative Building in Winnipeg, Manitoba, Canada